The Nigerian Nuclear Regulatory Authority (NNRA) is the government entity responsible for nuclear safety and radiological protection regulation in Nigeria. It was established pursuant to the Nuclear Act 1995 on August 3,1995 and began effective operation in 2001. The current director general of the NNRA is Dr Yau Usman Idris.

References 

Nuclear regulatory organizations
Government of Nigeria